Defending the Guilty is a  British television sitcom. It stars Will Sharpe and Katherine Parkinson as London barristers. The programme was broadcast in the United Kingdom from 19 September 2018 on BBC Two.
The show was recommissioned for a second series, but was later cancelled due to the impact of the COVID-19 pandemic.

Production
The series was created by Kieron Quirke and based on the 2010 best-selling memoir by Alex McBride (a criminal barrister).

Cast
Katherine Parkinson as Caroline Bratt, a senior barrister and Will's pupil master
Will Sharpe as Will Packham, a junior barrister and pupil
Gwyneth Keyworth as Danielle Sadler, a junior barrister and pupil
Hanako Footman as Pia, a junior barrister and pupil
Hugh Coles as Liam Mingay, a junior barrister and pupil
Prasanna Puwanarajah as Ashley Jeevaratnam, a senior barrister and Danielle's pupil master
Mark Bonnar as Miles Flynn, the Head of Chambers and Liam's pupil master
Claudia Jessie as Nessa, Will's girlfriend

Episodes

Special

Series 1

Notes

References

External links
 

2018 British television series debuts
2019 British television series endings
2010s British legal television series
2010s British sitcoms
2010s British workplace comedy television series
BBC television sitcoms
English-language television shows
Television series by Big Talk Productions
Television shows set in London
Television productions cancelled due to the COVID-19 pandemic